Hypnogaja (pronounced hip-nō-gä-zhä) is an American rock band founded by vocalist ShyBoy (Jason Arnold) and keyboardist Mark Nubar. Numerous TV shows, games, and movies have featured Hypnogaja's music including: Sex And The City (HBO); Warehouse 13 (SyFy); FlatOut: Ultimate Carnage (Warner Bros.); Tap Tap Revenge 3 (Disney); Roswell (WB); The Looking Glass Wars (Scholastic); Valentine (Warner Bros.); Cold Creek Manor (Touchstone); and the Scream 4 trailer (Dimension).

History

Early Years (2000-2002) 
Hypnogaja originated as an electronic studio project. Soon after independently releasing their debut album Revolution, the group signed with Los Angeles-based music publisher PEN Music Group and began a long string of music features in films, TV shows, and video games, with their first placements appearing in projects by filmmaker Zalman King. As a live show developed, the band began to incorporate guitars and acoustic drums which resulted in a more rock-oriented sound on the 2002 release Post-Hypnotic Stress Disorder.

Kill Switch (2003-2004) 
2003 began with the feature of Hypnogaja t-shirts and posters in the pilot episode of the Bryan Fuller series Dead Like Me. The band released the Kill Switch EP in August of that year, following the lead single and video "Nothing Box" (directed by Robert E. Blackmon). Hypnogaja embarked on their first U.S. tour in 2004 and continued to tour consistently throughout the aughts, opening for artists such as 311, Linda Perry, Shinedown, and Saliva.

Below Sunset and The Looking Glass Wars (2005-2007) 
In 2005, Hypnogaja released the critically acclaimed LP Below Sunset, described by Outburn magazine as "enthralling, first-rate modern rock," Apple Music as "soulful rock with a subtle electronic backdrop," and the Denver Post as music that "pushes boundaries.” The album contains Hypnogaja's widely popular cover of Eurythmics' "Here Comes the Rain Again" and the Alice in Wonderland themed "Looking Glass" (which was featured on the soundtrack for the audio book version of Frank Beddor's 2006 NY Times Best Seller, The Looking Glass Wars. Hypnogaja followed Below Sunset with the release of the live album Acoustic Sunset: Live At The Longhouse, produced by multi-platinum singer-songwriter Wendy Waldman, who co-wrote the album's new studio track "I'm Not One Of You."

Truth Decay and South by Southwest (2008-2011) 
Truth Decay, a science-fiction tinged concept album, was released in 2009 and received a 9 out-of-10 star rating from Outburn magazine, which noted it as an "expertly crafted album." The album's first single, "The March," spawned a music video directed by ASC Award-winning cinematographer, Nelson Cragg. During their tour in support of the album, Hypnogaja appeared on the debut episode of Stripped Down Live, hosted by Tears For Fears' Curt Smith. The band rounded out the aughts with a South by Southwest showcase slot and two wins at the Hollywood Music in Media Awards, one for Best Alternative Artist and one for Best Male Vocal for ShyBoy's performance of the Donna Summer song "On the Radio."

In February 2011, Hypnogaja released a remix of the Truth Decay song "Dark Star" (featuring Slimkid3 of The Pharcyde). The accompanying Chil Kong-directed video features an appearance by Slimkid3 and dancers from America's Best Dance Crew, including choreographer Yuri Tag and Cindy Minowa of Kabba Modern and Geo Lee of Instant Noodles.

ShyBoy Solo Work (2012-present)
ShyBoy and Mark Nubar founded L.A.-based indie label The Spaceman Agency in 2012. Since that time, they've released numerous recordings by ShyBoy, including the song "Backroom" (featured in the second season of Dynasty on The CW), which the pair co-wrote and co-produced with platinum-selling record producer Jeff Hoeppner. The track's official music video (directed by Michael Bodie), was premiered by World of Wonder, which described "Backroom" as a "gritty masterpiece." In December 2019, it was announced that The Spaceman Agency signed deals to distribute music of ShyBoy and Hypnogaja through Symphonic Distribution.

ShyBoy was named Best Solo Artist in the 10th Annual LA Weekly Best of L.A. Readers' Choice Awards and has performed throughout North America and in Europe, sharing the stage with artists such as Flo Rida, Meiko, and Amanda Palmer. His music has been featured in RuPaul’s Drag Race, America’s Next Top Model, the Capcom video game Devil May Cry 4, and the trailer for Halloween. An array of writers and artists have collaborated with ShyBoy, including: Emmy Award-winning performer RuPaul; Grammy-nominated singer-songwriter Wendy Waldman; Saturn Award-winning writer Bryan Fuller; DJ and record producer Darude; and Emmy, Grammy, and Tony Award-winning songwriter Allee Willis.

Latest Releases 
Hypnogaja released the single "Lovesick" on February 14, 2020. The song was originally written and demoed for ShyBoy's debut solo album Water On Mars. In 2019, ShyBoy and Mark Nubar collaborated with Jeff Hoeppner to produce and mix the song, which became Hypnogaja's first new recording since 2011.

On July 22, 2022, Hypnogaja's "Circle of Hate" single was released via The Spaceman Agency label.

Discography

Studio albums 

 2009: Truth Decay
 2005: Below Sunset
2003: Kill Switch EP
2003: Bridge To Nowhere (released in Germany by Sony Music)
2002: Post-Hypnotic Stress Disorder
2001: Hypnogaja EP
 1999: Revolution

Compilations & Other

2007: Audio From Last Night's Dream
2007: Mixtape
 2006: Acoustic Sunset: Live At The Longhouse (produced by Wendy Waldman)
 2004: White Label, Vol. 1

EPs & Singles

2022: Circle of Hate
2020: Lovesick
2011: Dark Star
2010: Welcome To The Future / On The Radio [Digital 45]
2009: Worship Me (I'm On TV)
2009: Apocalyptic Love Song
2009: I Can See Into Forever (Sammy Allen feat. Hypnogaja)
2008: The March

Videos

 Dark Star (featuring Slimkid3 of The Pharcyde) [directed by Chil Kong and choreographed by Yuri Tag of Kabba Modern]
 Welcome To The Future (directed by Graham Baclagon)
 Things Will Never Be The Same (directed by Kevin Heard)
 Apocalyptic Love Song (Live Acoustic Version) (directed by Paul Kulak)
 The March (directed by Nelson Cragg and Marius Markevicius)
 Quiet (directed by Ron Najor)
 Silver Star (directed by Graham Baclagon)
 Misery (directed by Graham Baclagon)
 They Don't Care (directed by Ron Najor)
 The Spaceman (Live Acoustic Version) (directed by Paul Kulak)
 Home (directed by Kristina Sky and Hypnogaja)
Nothing Box (directed by Robert E. Blackmon)

ShyBoy 

 ShyBoy Discography

Band members

Current 

 ShyBoy (Jason Arnold) - lead vocals (1999–present)
 Mark Nubar - keyboards (1999–present)
 Jeeve - guitar, bass, keyboards (2000–present)

Former 

 Bryan Farrar - bass (2009-2011)
 Abraham Parker - guitar (2009-2011)
 Adrian Barnardo - drums (2004-2011)
 Leif Bunting - bass (2000-2004)
 Tim Groeschel – guitar, drums (2000-2008)
Sandy Brown - vocals (1999-2002)
 Dr. Brooks - keyboards (1999-2000)

Session and live musicians
 Matt McJunkins - Bass (2008-2009)
 Bill Brennenstuhl - Drums (2003-2004)
 Daniel Wills - Bass (2003)

References

External links
 Official homepage
 Hypnogaja on YouTube
 

Alternative rock groups from California
Trip hop groups
Musical groups from Los Angeles